Frank McGee may refer to:

Frank McGee (baseball) (1899–1934), Major League first baseman
Frank McGee (ice hockey) (1882–1916), ice hockey player
Frank McGee (journalist) (1921–1974), broadcast journalist
Frank Charles McGee (1926–1999), member of the Parliament of Canada

See also
Frank Magee, film editor
Frank McGee (comics), a Marvel comics character